William Gerardo Matamba Portocarrero (born December 31, 1970) is a former Colombian footballer who played for clubs in Colombia, Chile and Peru.

Teams
 Deportivo Pereira 1990–1992
 Envigado 1993
 Once Caldas 1994
 Atlético Nacional 1995–1998
 Deportes Iquique 1999
 Deportivo Municipal 1999
 Cienciano 2000–2001

References

External links

1970 births
Living people
Colombian footballers
Deportivo Pereira footballers
Envigado F.C. players
Once Caldas footballers
Atlético Nacional footballers
Deportes Iquique footballers
Deportivo Municipal footballers
Cienciano footballers
Chilean Primera División players
Colombian expatriate footballers
Expatriate footballers in Chile
Expatriate footballers in Peru
Colombian expatriate sportspeople in Chile
Colombian expatriate sportspeople in Peru
People from Tumaco
Association football forwards
Sportspeople from Nariño Department
20th-century Colombian people